Christopher Hanell (born 30 May 1973) is a Swedish professional golfer.

Early life and amateur career
Hanell was born in Västervik. He attended Arizona State University in the United States and was part of the winning NCAA Division I championship team in 1996. He won two individual collegiate titles: the 1994 Taylor Made/Big Island Intercollegiate and the 1996 Golf Digest Collegiate. He was three-time All-American (1994, 1996, 1997) and an Academic All-American in 1997. He won the Golf Week and Golfstat Player of the Year awards in 1997

Professional career
Hanell turned professional in 1997 and gained his European Tour card in 1998 after finishing 13th on the European Challenge Tour money list. He claimed his first European Tour victory at the 2004 Madeira Island Open and has a best finish of 62nd place on the European Tour Order of Merit in both 1999, his rookie season, and 2004. He retired in 2008 after spending 10 years on the European Tour.

Professional wins (2)

European Tour wins (1)

1Dual-ranking event with the Challenge Tour

Challenge Tour wins (1)

1Dual-ranking event with the European Tour

Swedish Golf Tour wins (1)

Results in major championships

CUT = missed the halfway cut
Note: Hanell only played in The Open Championship.

Team appearances
Amateur
European Boys' Team Championship (representing Finland): 1991 (winners)
Jacques Léglise Trophy (representing the Continent of Europe): 1991
European Youths' Team Championship: 1994
St Andrews Trophy (representing the Continent of Europe): 1994
European Amateur Team Championship (representing Sweden): 1995
Eisenhower Trophy (representing Sweden): 1996

Sources:

References

External links

Swedish male golfers
Arizona State Sun Devils men's golfers
European Tour golfers
Sportspeople from Kalmar County
People from Västervik Municipality
1973 births
Living people